Uxbridge Cricket Club is a cricket club based in Uxbridge, Middlesex.  Uxbridge CC is a member of the Middlesex County Cricket League which is a designated ECB Premier League.

History
There are records of Cricket being played in the Uxbridge area as far back as 1735.  The official founding date of Uxbridge Cricket Club is 1789.

The first games were played on the Uxbridge Moor area of the town, later moving to Uxbridge Common.  In 1858 the club moved again, to a field behind the Eastern end of Uxbridge High Street, and remained there until 1970 when the redevelopment of the town centre obliged the club to seek a new home.  The club moved to the present site, opposite Uxbridge Common.

For a number of years Middlesex County Cricket Club played County Championship and List-A matches at the Uxbridge Cricket Club Ground.  In recent years the County team has moved out of Uxbridge due to the pitch being deemed too batsmen friendly.  However, the County has now returned to Uxbridge to play Twenty20 matches from 2003 and has played the odd County game there during 2010.

The high points of the club have been the winning of the Thames Valley Cricket League in 1982 followed by reaching the Final of the Evening Standard Challenge Trophy in 2000.  Since 1989, Uxbridge has been playing in the Middlesex County Cricket League, the foremost league in the county.

Other sports
The club offers a number of other sports including bowls, with Uxbridge Bowls Club being founded in 1908.  The club has an adjoining rugby club.  Uxbridge RFC was formed from two clubs, namely Borderers RFC & Old Creightonians in 1947. In 1991 Uxbridge RFC merged with Uxbridge Cricket Club.  The club also has squash and tennis sections.

External links

 Club website

Uxbridge
Sport in the London Borough of Hillingdon
Cricket teams in London
1789 establishments in England
Uxbridge
Cricket in Middlesex